WWE Armageddon was a professional wrestling pay-per-view (PPV) event produced by World Wrestling Entertainment (WWE), a professional wrestling promotion based in Connecticut. The event was created in 1999, when the promotion was still called the World Wrestling Federation (WWF, renamed to WWE in 2002). It was held every December except in 2001, as that year, Vengeance replaced Armageddon as the event's name was thought to be insensitive following the September 11 attacks, although Armageddon was reinstated in 2002 with Vengeance moving up to July. 

To coincide with the brand extension introduced in 2002, the event was made exclusive to the Raw brand in 2003 before becoming SmackDown-exclusive from 2004 to 2006. Following WrestleMania 23 in 2007, brand-exclusive PPVs were discontinued. The final event was held in 2008, with TLC: Tables, Ladders & Chairs replacing Armageddon in 2009.

History
From May 1995 to February 1999, the World Wrestling Federation (WWF, now WWE) held a series of monthly pay-per-views (PPV) titled In Your House. The WWF discontinued the In Your House series to establish permanent names for the monthly PPVs that would be held annually. Armageddon was established that year to be held as the annual December PPV. The inaugural Armageddon was held on December 12, 1999, at the National Car Rental Center in Sunrise, Florida and it aired live on PPV. The first two Armageddon events were held when the promotion was still called the WWF. In 2001, Armageddon was replaced by Vengeance due to the September 11 attacks; the promotion felt that the name "Armageddon" would offend victims of the attacks. Armageddon, however, was reinstated in 2002 with Vengeance moving up to July.

In 2002, the WWF changed its name to World Wrestling Entertainment (WWE) due to a court order following a lawsuit from the World Wildlife Fund over the "WWF" initialism. The promotion also held their very first draft that year to split its roster into two distinctive brands of wrestling, Raw and SmackDown!, where wrestlers would exclusively perform—ECW was added as a third brand in 2006. The 2002 event featured wrestlers from both Raw and SmackDown!, but the 2003 event was held exclusively for the Raw brand. It was then held exclusively for the SmackDown! brand from 2004 to 2006. Following WrestleMania 23 in 2007, WWE discontinued brand-exclusive PPVs. The 2007 event was the last pay-per-view to be broadcast by WWE in 480p standard definition format. In January 2008, all WWE programming switched to 720p high definition. The 2008 event was the final event as Armageddon was discontinued and replaced by TLC: Tables, Ladders & Chairs in 2009.

Events

See also
 List of WWE pay-per-view events

References

External links
Official Armageddon website

 
Recurring sporting events established in 1999
Recurring events disestablished in 2008